Sylvanus Timotheus Blackman (1 July 1933 – 23 January 2021) was a male weightlifter who competed for Barbados, England and Great Britain.

Weightlifting career
He competed at three Olympic Games in 1960, 1964 and 1968. He represented his country of birth, (Barbados) and won a silver medal in 82.5 kg, at the 1958 British Empire and Commonwealth Games in Cardiff, Wales. Eight years later he represented England and won another silver medal in 82.5 kg, at the 1966 British Empire and Commonwealth Games in Kingston, Jamaica.

References

1933 births
2021 deaths
English male weightlifters
British male weightlifters
Commonwealth Games silver medallists for England
Commonwealth Games silver medallists for Barbados
Weightlifters at the 1958 British Empire and Commonwealth Games
Weightlifters at the 1966 British Empire and Commonwealth Games
Olympic weightlifters of Great Britain
Weightlifters at the 1960 Summer Olympics
Weightlifters at the 1964 Summer Olympics
Weightlifters at the 1968 Summer Olympics
Commonwealth Games medallists in weightlifting
Medallists at the 1958 British Empire and Commonwealth Games
Medallists at the 1966 British Empire and Commonwealth Games